The Ammonite Snail (Helenoconcha relicta) is a species of small air-breathing land snails, terrestrial pulmonate gastropod mollusks in the family Charopidae. The species is endemic to Saint Helena Island, and is the only Helenoconcha species remaining.

References

Helenoconcha
Gastropods described in 1977